Swadhinata Krira Sangha is a Bangladeshi association football club based in Dhaka. They currently compete in the Bangladesh Championship League, the second tier of Bangladeshi football, following relegation from the 2021–22 Bangladesh Premier League.

History

Current squad
Swadhinata KS squad for 2021–22 season.

Team records

Head coaches' record

Honours

League
 Bangladesh Championship League
Winners (1): 2020–21
Senior Division League
Winners (1): 2017

References

Football clubs in Bangladesh
2005 establishments in Bangladesh
Sport in Dhaka
Bangladesh Championship League
Association football clubs established in 2005